

471001–471100 

|-bgcolor=#f2f2f2
| colspan=4 align=center | 
|}

471101–471200 

|-id=109
| 471109 Vladobahýl ||  || Vladimír Bahýl (born 1948), Associate Professor Emeritus at the Technical University in Zvolen, constructed a computed tomography scanner used in dendrology. Asan amateur astronomer he is a dedicated observer of variable stars, asteroids and meteors. He built his own observatory named after his granddaughter, Julia. || 
|-id=143
| 471143 Dziewanna ||  || Devana (Dziewanna), is a Slavic goddess of the wild nature, forests and the hunt. Gold-haired, young and beautiful, she brings the spring and revitalizes the Earth. Wild yellow mullein flowers (Polish: dziewanna) are her symbol. Dried, they served as torches during her celebrations. || 
|}

471201–471300 

|-bgcolor=#f2f2f2
| colspan=4 align=center | 
|}

471301–471400 

|-
| 471301 Robertajmolson ||  || Roberta J. M. Olson (born 1947), an American art historian, curator, and author, who first identified Halley's Comet as a template for the Star of Bethlehem in Giotto's Adoration of the Magi, which in turn inspired the European Space Agency to name its Giotto spacecraft which studied Halley's Comet after the Italian Renaissance painter (Src). || 
|}

471401–471500 

|-bgcolor=#f2f2f2
| colspan=4 align=center | 
|}

471501–471600 

|-bgcolor=#f2f2f2
| colspan=4 align=center | 
|}

471601–471700 

|-bgcolor=#f2f2f2
| colspan=4 align=center | 
|}

471701–471800 

|-bgcolor=#f2f2f2
| colspan=4 align=center | 
|}

471801–471900 

|-bgcolor=#f2f2f2
| colspan=4 align=center | 
|}

471901–472000 

|-id=926
| 471926 Jörmungandr ||  || Jörmungandr was a sea serpent in Norse mythology. The serpent was so large that it surrounded the earth and grasped its own tail; when it moved in the ocean, it caused huge storm surges. || 
|}

References 

471001-472000